The Kim Liên Temple, Chữ Hán: 金蓮寺) is a Buddhist temple in Hanoi. The temple is built on a strip of silt land by West Lake, then in Nghi Tàm village, today in Quảng An village, Tây Hồ district. According to tradition, the temple was built on the foundation of the Lý dynasty Từ Hoa Palace, named after princess Từ Hoa, daughter of Lý Thần Tông (1128-1138), in an area used as a royal silk farm. The current temple was reconstructed 1771–1792.

References

Buddhist temples in Hanoi